Warn That Man! is a 1941 comedy thriller play by the British writer Vernon Sylvaine. A comedy-thriller, its plot concerns an attempt to kidnap wartime Prime Minister Winston Churchill from an English country house.

Having debuted at the New Theatre, Oxford, it then ran for 352 performances at the Garrick Theatre in the West End between December 1941 and September 1942. Amongst its cast were Gordon Harker, Veronica Rose, Basil Radford, Ethel Coleridge and Judy Kelly.

Adaptation

In 1943 it was turned into a film directed by Lawrence Huntington and made at Welwyn Studios. Gordon Harker reprised his role from the play while Raymond Lovell and Jean Kent also starred.

References

Bibliography
 Wearing, J.P. The London Stage 1940-1949: A Calendar of Productions, Performers, and Personnel.  Rowman & Littlefield, 2014.

1941 plays
British plays adapted into films
Plays by Vernon Sylvaine
Plays set in London
Comedy plays
West End plays